This is a list of presidents of the Constitutional Court of Austria. The president of the Constitutional Court is the head and presiding judge of the Austrian Constitutional Court.

List of officeholders

See also
 Judiciary of Austria
 History of Austria
 Politics of Austria
 Supreme Court of Justice (Austria)

External links
 Members of the Constitutional Court

References 

Constitutional Court of Austria judges